Todas as Mulheres do Mundo (English title: All the Women in the World) is a Brazilian television series that was released on Globoplay on 23 April 2020. The series is based on the 1966 film of the same name, written by Domingos de Oliveira. It stars Emilio Dantas, Sophie Charlotte, Martha Nowill, and Matheus Nachtergaele.

Premise 
Paulo is an architect who is passionate with freedom, poetry, and women. In search of his great love, he is capable of being enchanted several times and falling deeply to each relationship. Paulo believes that love feeds his soul as a poet and sees the essence of each of the women whom he is involved with.

Cast 
 Emilio Dantas as Paulo
 Sophie Charlotte as Maria Alice
 Martha Nowill as Laura
 Matheus Nachtergaele as Cabral

Episodes

Awards and nominations

References

External links 
 

2010s Brazilian television series
2020 Brazilian television series debuts
Portuguese-language television shows
Globoplay original programming
Brazilian comedy television series